Maria Carmela Lanzetta (born 1 March 1955) is an Italian politician, who served as Minister of Regional Affairs and Autonomy from 22 February 2014 to 30 January 2015 as part of the Renzi Cabinet.

She was the mayor of Monasterace from 2006 to 2013.

References

1955 births
Living people
Democratic Party (Italy) politicians
21st-century Italian politicians
Women mayors of places in Italy
Renzi Cabinet
21st-century Italian women politicians
Women government ministers of Italy
Italia Viva politicians